Pointe-Heath Ecological Reserve is an ecological reserve in Quebec, Canada. It was established on March 22, 1978.

References

External links
 Official website from Government of Québec

Protected areas of Côte-Nord
Nature reserves in Quebec

Protected areas established in 1978
Anticosti Island
1978 establishments in Quebec